Dismissal or dismissed may refer to:

Dismissal 

In litigation, a dismissal is the result of a successful motion to dismiss. See motion
Termination of employment, the end of employee's duration with an employer
Dismissal (employment), termination of employment against the will of the worker
Dismissal (cricket), when the batsman is out 
Dismissal (education), termination of a student from a university or school
The 1975 Australian constitutional crisis is commonly known as the Dismissal 
The 1932 New South Wales constitutional crisis was previously known as the Dismissal before the events of 1975
In association football, a dismissal is a sort of penalty, see Misconduct
Apolytikion (dismissal hymn), in Eastern Orthodox liturgics
Dismissal (liturgy), the final benediction at the end of a service
"Dismissal", hymn tune by William Litton Viner
In United States armed forces, a dismissal is the equivalent for commissioned officers of the "dishonorable discharge" for enlisted members. See Military discharge#Commissioned officers

Dismissed 

Dismissed (TV series), a reality television show on MTV that premiered in 2001
an episode of Power Ranger: SPD, see List of Power Rangers S.P.D. episodes
Dismissed (band), Swedish musical band
"Dismissed" (ZOEgirl song)
"Dismissed", a song by Uffie from Ed Rec Vol. 2